Capponi is a surname. Notable people with the surname include:

Carla Capponi (1918-2000), Italian politician
Claudio Capponi (born 1959), Italian film composer
Filippo Fasio Capponi (d. 1570), Italian Roman Catholic prelate
Gino Capponi (1792–1876), Italian statesman and historian
Giuseppe Capponi (1832–1889), Italian operatic tenor
Luigi Capponi (1582–1659), Italian Roman Catholic cardinal
Michael Capponi (born 1972), American businessman
Pat Capponi (born 1949), Canadian author
Pier Paolo Capponi (1938–2018), Italian actor and screenwriter
Piero Capponi (1447–1496), Italian statesman and historian

Italian-language surnames